The 2015 State of the Nation Address was the sixth and last State of the Nation Address delivered by President Benigno Aquino III.

Seating and guests
Two former president of the Philippines, Joseph Estrada and Fidel Ramos were among the attendees of the SONA.

Address content and delivery

The speech was the longest of State of the Nation Address in recent Philippine history upon its completion at 2 hours and 13 minutes. He discussed the list of priority bills set at least until 2016, attributed his problems to his predecessor, and thanked his cabinet and all other people who assisted him. His policy of "Daang Matuwid" (Straight Path) is also the centerpiece of his speech. He used videos to supplement his speech.

Aquino blamed the issues experienced by the MRT-3 Metro Rail Transit Corporation, the private corporation tasked to managed elevated rail system. According to Aquino, the contract between the government and the company and a series of temporary restraining orders and arbitration was the reason for the lack of improvement of the rail system. He encouraged the much-criticized Department of Transportation and Communication secretary, Jun Abaya and told him not to lose heart over his critics and praised him for his accomplishments. He highlighted the granting of Category One rating from the United States Federal Aviation Agency, which enables local carrier to create flight routes with locations in the United States and the lifting of a ban over local carriers by the European Union to make flights to its member countries.

He called on for the passage of the Bangsamoro Basic Law and an anti-dynasty bill.  He obliged critics of the Bangsamoro bill to come up with an alternative.

Aquino thanked his current cabinet, and some former department secretaries which includes Energy Secretary Jericho Petilla and the late Interior Secretary Jesse Robredo. He also thanked his personal secretaries, close-in assistants, stylists and household manager. One of the notable omission was Vice President Jejomar Binay whom he didn't extend gratitude.

Reactions

Jejomar Binay
In a speech made at the Cavite State University which he brands as the "true State of the Nation Address", Vice President Jejomar Binay elaborated what he thinks the problems the Aquino administration did not address which includes the poverty, unemployment, issues at the MRT, and how certain disasters and incidents are dealt and managed specifically the 2010 Manila hostage crisis, Typhoon Haiyan, 2013 Zamboanga City crisis and the Mamasapano clash. He specifically noted the President's omission of the SAF 44 in Aquino's SONA and criticized Aquino for it.

Senators
Senator Grace Poe, expressed concern over the lack of mention of the Freedom of Information Bill.

Other politicians
Davao City Mayor, Rodrigo Duterte and his son Vice Mayor Paolo Duterte expressed disappointment over President Aquino's speech. They urged Aquino to stop blaming the previous administration particularly of Gloria Macapagal Arroyo over issues Aquino is dealing with. Mayor Duterte graded the speech 7 on a scale of 1 to 10 saying that he should have tackled more on solving criminality. Duterte said that the president seemed not to be informed of the drug problem particularly a report of the Manila police that 9 out of 10 of youth is influenced by drugs which he views as a national concern. He described Aquino as a "clean man" but added that he "cannot comment about other people around him (Aquino)."

Protests by militant groups
Bagong Alyansang Makabayan organized protest outside the Batasang Pambansa, the venue of the SONA to protest against the government of Aquino. The militant group's secretary general Renato Reyes Jr. estimated that about 20,000 people from various sectors turned up for the protests along Commonwealth Avenue. The police has a lower estimate of the number of people which attended the protests at less than 5,000. 35 people were reported to be injured, 27 civilians and 8 police personnel. Among those injured among the police were two policemen who allegedly tried to spy on the militants hours before the presidential speech. The police said that they will file charges of direct assault and robbery against the militants who reportedly took the cellphones of the security personnels which the security organization views as a violation of Batas Pambansa 880.

Quezon City Police District director Chief Superintendent Joel Pagdilao, said the protests were relatively peaceful compared to mass organizations during the previous SONAs. Pagdilao said that this is due to the police force's restraint and maximum tolerance towards the protestors.

Aftermath

References

External links
Full Video of the 2015 State of the Nation Address
Full Video of the 2015 State of the Nation Address at Rappler

State of the Nation Address
2015 speeches
2015
Presidency of Benigno Aquino III
Speeches by Benigno Aquino III